The Art of Survival is the ninth studio album by British alternative rock band Bush. It was released on 7 October 2022 through BMG Records and follows the band's 2020 effort The Kingdom.

Content 
Carla Valois Lobo of MusicOHM described The Art of Survival as "post-grunge done right", while Guitar.com labelled the album's sound as "polished, modern hard rock". Kerrang compared the riffs on "More than Machines" to the American nu metal band Korn, while LouderSound equated those on "Heavy is the Ocean" and "Kiss Me I'm Dead" to Alice in Chains and Black Sabbath.

Reception 

Neil Z. Yeung of AllMusic described The Art of Survival as Bush's best effort since their 2002–2010 hiatus.

John Aizelwood of Classic Rock gave a largely praising 4-star review of The Art of Survival.

British newspaper The Telegraph gave a mixed three-star review of The Art of Survival. Reviewer Siobhan Grogan described the record's social commentary as "clumsy" and as having "the thoughtful gravitas of a teenage boy". Nonetheless, Siobhan opined that the album's heavy sound suited the lyrical sense of doom, praising songs such as "Slow Me", "Human Sand" and "Kiss Me I'm Dead", and stated the record had a "powerful, personal relevance".

Track listing

Personnel 
Bush
 Gavin Rossdale – vocals, production
 Chris Traynor – guitar
 Corey Britz – bass
 Nik Hughes – drums

Additional personnel
 Erik Ron – production, mixing, guitar, background vocals
 Tyler Bates – additional production (tracks 7, 8)
 Sacha Puttnam – keyboards
 Chris Athens – mastering
 Anthony Reeder – engineering
 John Ewing, Jr. – engineering
 Isabel Gracefield – engineering (6, 10)
 Connor Panayi – engineering assistance (6, 10)
 Neil Krug – artwork
 Dale Voelker – design
 Thomas Rabsch – band photo

Charts

References 

2022 albums
BMG Rights Management albums